Kingman (foaled 26 February 2011) is a champion British Thoroughbred racehorse who was the 2014 European Horse of the Year after winning the Irish 2000 Guineas, St. James's Palace Stakes, Sussex Stakes, and Prix Jacques le Marois

He is owned by Khalid Abdullah and trained by John Gosden.

Racing career

2013: two-year-old season
Kingman's career began with a six-length win in a maiden race at Newmarket under jockey Ryan Moore. Moore was impressed by the colt but called the ante-post price for the 2000 Guineas of 10/1 an overreaction. His next race was the Group 3 Solario Stakes at Sandown Park Racecourse this time with Khalid Abdullah's new retained jockey James Doyle on board. Kingman won by two lengths from Godolphin's colt Emirates Flyer. Following the win his price for the 2,000 Guineas was again cut. Gosden shared plans for a run in the Dewhurst Stakes but these were scrapped following a bone chip.

2014: three-year-old season
Following recovery from an operation to remove the bone chip, Kingman made his three-year-old debut in the Greenham Stakes at Newbury Racecourse. He accelerated in the final two furlongs to win by four and a half lengths. Following the victory the Guineas price was once again cut with some bookmakers making Kingman joint favourite to the Aidan O'Brien trained Australia  Kingman started favourite for the 2000 Guineas at Newmarket but was beaten into second place by Night of Thunder, with Australia in third place. On 24 May, Kingman recorded his first Group One success when he won the Irish 2000 Guineas at the Curragh Racecourse.

On 18 June at Royal Ascot, Kingman reversed the Newmarket result, beating Night of Thunder by two and a quarter lengths in the St James's Palace Stakes. For his next race, the Sussex Stakes at Goodwood, he was matched against the Richard Hannon-four-year-old Toronado in what was billed as a second Duel on the Downs. He won by a length from Toronado, with Darwin in third. The colt was then sent to France for the Prix Jacques le Marois over 1600 metres at Deauville Racecourse on 17 August. He started the 2/7 favourite against four opponents, headed by the Queen Elizabeth II Stakes winner Olympic Glory. Doyle restrained him at the back of the field before taking the lead 200 metres from the finish and drew clear to win by two and a half lengths from Anodin, who beat Olympic Glory and Rizeena in a close race for second.

Kingman's retirement from racing was announced on 22 September. He had contracted a throat infection which prevented him from being trained for projected runs in the Queen Elizabeth II Stakes and the Breeders' Cup Mile.

Stud career 
Kingman has stood at Banstead Manor Stud alongside Frankel since the 2015 breeding season. His first yearlings sold for up to 1.7 million guineas in 2017. In 2018, he sired Group 2 Coventry Stakes winner Calyx at Royal Ascot, Group 3 winner Persian King and three further stakes winners from his first crop of two-year-olds. He was the fourth leading sire in Europe by yearling average behind Galileo, Dubawi and Frankel.

Notable progeny

c = colt, f = filly, g = gelding

Assessment and awards
In November, Kingman was named Champion Three-year-old Colt and Horse of the Year at the Cartier Racing Awards.

In the 2014 World's Best Racehorse Rankings, Kingman was rated the third-best horse to race anywhere in the world in 2014 behind the Japanese horses Just A Way and Epiphaneia and level with Able Friend, Australia, The Grey Gatsby, and Variety Club, making him the joint top-rated three-year-old.

Pedigree

References

External links
 Career 1-2-3 Colour Chart – Kingman

2011 racehorse births
Racehorses trained in the United Kingdom
Racehorses bred in the United Kingdom
Thoroughbred family 19
Irish Classic Race winners
Cartier Award winners
European Thoroughbred Horse of the Year